Julian Gollop is a British computer game designer and producer specialising in strategy games, who has founded and led Mythos Games, Codo Technologies and Snapshot Games. He is known best as the "man who gave birth to the X-COM franchise."

Biography

Childhood 
Julian Gollop was born in 1965. He came of age in Harlow, England. When he was a child, his father introduced him to many different types of games, including chess, card games, and board games. His family played games regularly, choosing to play games instead of going to see films. When he was about 14 years old, Gollop started playing more complex games like Dungeons & Dragons, SPI board games, and Avalon Hill board games. After home computers became a reality while he was in secondary school, Gollop's fascination for complex strategy games helped him recognise how computers could allow him to make and play games he enjoyed.

Early career (1982 to 1988)
In 1982, while he was still in secondary school, Gollop started designing and programming computer games. For £25, Gollop bought his first computer, a ZX81, from a school friend to learn programming. Even though the ZX81 only had one kilobyte of memory and no real graphics processing ability, he was "amazed" at its capabilities. His first published games were Islandia and Time Lords, which he made for the BBC Micro in 1983 with programmer Andy Greene, a school friend. Gollop subsequently upgraded to a ZX Spectrum and began creating video games like Nebula in BASIC. He recognised that his future involved computers.

When Gollop went on to the London School of Economics to study sociology, he spent more time creating video games such as Chaos: The Battle of Wizards and Rebelstar than he spent studying. He created the first Rebelstar by himself as a two-player game and brought it to a publisher that had an office near his college. They wanted it to be a single-player game, something he had not made before, so Gollop created functional path-finding algorithms from scratch, the game got published, and it ended up doing well.

Mythos Games (1988 to 2001) 
In 1988, he was joined by his brother, Nick Gollop, in founding Target Games, a video game development company that subsequently changed to Mythos Games. Under the Mythos name, the Gollop brothers designed and developed computer games such as Laser Squad, X-COM: UFO Defense and X-COM: Apocalypse. Up to this time, Gollop had only made computer games for 8-bit and 16-bit home computers commonly found in Europe. It was with X-COM: UFO Defense that he first beginning making video games directly for the MS-DOS and later Microsoft Windows operating system personal computers that at the time would be sold primarily in the United States. Despite the success of these and other games, Mythos Games was forced to close in 2001 after an essential publisher was acquired by a company that withdrew commitments for The Dreamland Chronicles: Freedom Ridge, which Mythos Games was in the process of developing.

Codo Technologies (2001 to 2006) 
After closing Mythos Games, Gollop and his brother founded Codo Technologies. They were disheartened by how mainstream publishers treated them at Mythos Games, so they tried a different business model. The inaugural game of Codo Technologies in 2002 was Laser Squad Nemesis, a turn-based tactics game with asynchronous, multiplayer play-by-email features which required a monthly subscription. The Gollop brothers developed only one other game, Rebelstar: Tactical Command, before he moved to Bulgaria with his wife in 2006.

Ubisoft Sofia (2006 to 2012) 
After moving to Bulgaria, Gollop began working for Ubisoft in Sofia as a game designer. He was promoted quickly to producer, eventually leading the development of Tom Clancy's Ghost Recon: Shadow Wars for the Nintendo 3DS. He then became the co-creative director of Assassin's Creed III: Liberation for the PlayStation Vita. Gollop left Ubisoft in 2012 with ideas to remake games from earlier in his career.

Snapshot Games (since 2013) 
As of 2017, Gollop works in Sofia as the CEO and chief designer for Snapshot Games, an independent video game developer he co-founded in 2013 with David Kaye. Chaos Reborn, the studio's first game, was released by Snapshot Games in 2015. He then led his company's development of Phoenix Point, which was released in December 2019.

Accolades
IGN included him among the top hundred computer game creators of all time. In the X-COM reboot, XCOM: Enemy Unknown, Firaxis Games gives homage to Gollop in the form of a "Gollop Chamber" facility in the game. Jake Solomon, creative lead for this XCOM and its sequel, XCOM 2, credits Gollop for much of his success.

List of computer games

References

External links
 
 
 Gameography at Mythos Games website by WayBackMachine (2002)

1965 births
Board game designers
British founders
British video game designers
British video game programmers
Living people
People from Harlow
Video game producers
XCOM